Christina Kim (born 1957) is a South Korean-born fashion designer based in Los Angeles, California, United States, and founder of design house Dosa.

Early life and career
Kim was born in South Korea, and came to the United States with her family in 1971, at the age of 15. She would go on to work in the import/export industry beginning in the mid-1980s. Dosa employed 30 people as of 2007, with a  workspace in Los Angeles, as well as a  store in New York City.  Her joint work with jeweller Pippa Small was featured in London's Anthony d'Offay Gallery in 2002; she continued working with d'Offay after the closure of his gallery. She was one of three finalists for the Smithsonian Institution's National Design Award in the area of Fashion Design in 2003. She does not hold or participate in fashion shows in order to promote her products, and refers to herself as an "artist" rather than a stylist; further, she designs a new collection only once a year, in contrast to the typical fashion-design practice of designing new collections for every season. She works with traditional craftspeople in Bosnia, Cambodia, China, India, Kenya, Korea, Mexico,  and Peru, and has been noted for her extensive use of traditional materials. She has stated that she is particularly fond of khadi, a hand-woven Indian cloth; In 2002, she employed roughly 500 women in India's Assam region to spin eri silk for her. Jennifer Aniston, Julia Roberts, and Nicole Kidman count themselves among her fans.

References

External links 
 Dosa home page

1957 births
American fashion designers
American women fashion designers
Living people
South Korean emigrants to the United States
21st-century American women